Rajac can refer to the following places in Serbia:
 Mount Rajac, part of Suvobor
 Rajac (Čačak), a village near Čačak
 Rajac (Negotin), a village near Negotin